The Battle of Deutschbrod or Německý Brod took place on 10 January 1422, in Deutschbrod (Německý Brod, now Havlíčkův Brod), Bohemia, during the Hussite Wars. Led by Jan Žižka, the Hussites besieged 2,000 Royalist crusaders. The Roman Catholic crusaders were no match for the Hussites and Deutschbrod was quickly taken and sacked. A Royalist arsenal and supply train, numbering some 500 wagons, was captured, one of the largest amounts of loot that the Hussites would take throughout the whole war.

References

External links 
List of Hussite Battles

1422 in Europe
Deutschbrod 1422
Deutschbrod 1422
Deutschbrod
Deutschbrod
Jan Žižka
Havlíčkův Brod
History of the Vysočina Region